This is a timeline documenting events and facts about English-speaking stand-up comedy in the year 2020.

January 
 January 3: Ilana Glazer's special The Planet Is Burning for Amazon Prime Video.
 January 14: Leslie Jones's special Time Machine on Netflix
 January 21: Fortune Feimster's special Sweet and Salty for Netflix.
 January 26: Vir Das's special For India on Netflix.
 January 28: Alex Fernándezs special The Best Comedian in the World on Netflix.
 January 28: Maria Bamford's special Weakness Is the Brand on Comedy Dynamics.

February 
 February 4: Tom Papa's special You're Doing Great on Netflix.
 February 11: Sam Morril's special I Got This on YouTube.
 February 22: Whitmer Thomas's special The Golden One on HBO.
 February 25: Pete Davidson's special Alive From New York on Netflix.

March 
 March 3: Taylor Tomlinson's special Quarter Life Crisis on Netflix.
 March 10: Marc Maron's special End Times Fun on Netflix.
 March 17: Bert Kreischer's special Hey Big Boy on Netflix.
 March 24: Tom Segura's special Ball Hog on Netflix.

April 
 April 4: Louis C.K.'s special Sincerely on his website.
 April 14: Chris D'Elia's special No Pain on Netflix.
 April 14: Christopher Titus's special Born With A Defect on christophertitustv.

May 
 May 1: Tom Walker's mime show special Very Very on Amazon.
 May 5: Jerry Seinfeld's special 23 Hours to Kill on Netflix.
 May 8: Jimmy O. Yang's special Good Deal on Amazon.
 May 12: Mark Normand's special Out to Lunch on YouTube.
 May 19: Patton Oswalt's special I Love Everything on Netflix.
 May 19: Doug Stanhope's special The Dying of a Last Breed on Vimeo.
 May 26 Hannah Gadsby's special Douglas on Netflix.

June 
 June 12: Dave Chappelle's special 8:46 on YouTube.
 June 23: Eric Andre's special Legalize Everything on Netflix.
 June 30: George Lopez's special We'll Do It For Half on Netflix.

July 
 July 3: Hannibal Buress's special Miami Nights on YouTube.
 July 7: Jim Jefferies's special Intolerant on Netflix.
 July 17: Esther Povitsky's special Hot for My Name on Comedy Central.
 July 21: Jack Whitehall's special I'm Only Joking on Netflix.
 July 24: Jim Gaffigan's special The Pale Tourist on Amazon.
 July 24: Frankie Boyle's special Excited For You To See And Hate This on BBC 2.

August 
 August 4: Sam Jay's special 3 in the Morning on Netflix.
 August 6: Joe List's special I Hate Myself on YouTube.
 August 20: Beth Stelling's special Girl Daddy on HBO Max.

September 
 September 1: Felipe Esparza's special Bad Decisions on Netflix.
 September 12: Michael McIntyre's special Showman on Netflix.

October 
 October 6: Lewis Black's special Thanks for Risking Your Life.
 October 23: Tim Heidecker's special An Evening With Tim Heidecker on YouTube.
 October 23: Chelsea Handler's special Evolution on HBO Max.

November 
 November 17: Kevin Hart's special Zero F**ks Given on Netflix.

December 
 December 17: James Acaster's special Cold Lasagne Hate Myself 1999 live-streamed on DICE.
 December 22: London Hughes's special London Hughes: To Catch a D*ck on Netflix.

See also 
 List of stand-up comedians

References 

Stand-up comedy
Stand-up comedy
2020s in comedy
Stand-up comedy
Culture-related timelines by year